Evening Clothes is a 1927 American silent comedy film directed by Luther Reed that was produced by Famous Players-Lasky and released by Paramount.

Production background
The film is based on the 1920 play L'homme en habit (The Man in Evening Clothes) by Andre Picard and Yves Mirande. Directed by Luther Reed, the film starred Adolphe Menjou, Virginia Valli, and Louise Brooks and is currently considered a lost film.

As part of Paramount's production of multiple-language versions of its films, two remakes were made in 1931 at the Joinville Studios in Paris, the Spanish-language film A Gentleman in Tails and the French-language film The Man in Evening Clothes.

Cast
Adolphe Menjou as Lucien D'Artois
Virginia Valli as Germaine
Noah Beery as Lazarre
Louise Brooks as Fox Trot
Arnold Kent as Henri (credited as Lido Manetti)
André Cheron as Germaine's father
Mario Carillo as Undetermined Role (uncredited)
Lilyan Tashman as Undetermined Role (uncredited)

References

External links

Foreign release poster of Evening Clothes
Stills at silenthollywood.com
Still at Louise Brooks Society

1927 films
American silent feature films
Famous Players-Lasky films
American films based on plays
Lost American films
1927 comedy films
Silent American comedy films
American black-and-white films
Films directed by Luther Reed
1927 lost films
Lost comedy films
1920s American films